Juan Sebastián Cabal and Robert Farah were the defending champions and they reached the final.

Treat Conrad Huey and Izak van der Merwe won the title, defeating Cabal and Farah 7–6(7–3), 6–7(5–7), [7–2]. Cabal has thrown his racket to van der Merwe, and the referee decided to end the final, when van der Merwe/Huey win [7–2] in the super tie.

Seeds

Draw

Draw

References
 Main Draw

Open Seguros Bolivar- Doubles
2011 MD